The men's 100 metres event at the 2016 IAAF World U20 Championships was held at Zdzisław Krzyszkowiak Stadium on 19 and 20 July.

Medalists

Records

Results

Heats
Qualification: First 3 of each heat (Q) and the 6 fastest times (q) qualified for the semifinals.

Wind:Heat 1: -0.4 m/s, Heat 2: +0.6 m/s, Heat 3: +0.7 m/s, Heat 4: +0.4 m/s, Heat 5: +0.6 m/s, Heat 6: -0.6 m/s

Semifinals

Qualification: First 2 of each heat (Q) and the 2 fastest times (q) qualified for the final.

Wind:Heat 1: -0.6 m/s, Heat 2: +0.2 m/s, Heat 3: +0.7 m/s

Final

Wind: +0.2 m/s

References

100 metres
100 metres at the World Athletics U20 Championships